Li Chengming (born 11 April 1978) is a former Chinese footballer who played as a defender for the Shanghai Shenhua. He currently serves as an assistant coach for the Shanghai-based club.

Career statistics

Club

Notes

References

1978 births
Living people
Chinese footballers
Association football defenders
Shanghai Shenhua F.C. players
Chinese Super League players
Shanghai Shenhua F.C. non-playing staff